China hosted the 2007 Asian Winter Games which were held in Changchun from January 28, 2007, to February 4, 2007.

Medal summary

Medal table

Participation details
The host country is sending a delegation of 159 athletes competing in all the scheduled events.

Results by event

Alpine skiing

Entry list

 Cang Song
 Dong Jinzhi
 Li Guangxu 
 Li Lei
 Liu Jing
 Liu Peihua
 Liu Rui
 Li Yang

 Miao Liyan
 Qin Xiuye 
 Ren Zhipeng
 Tian Yuheng
 Xia Lina
 Yin Hhuanhuan
 Zhang Honglei 
 Zheng Min

Biathlon

Entry list

 Chen Haibin
 Dong Xue
 Kong Yingchao
 Liu Xianying
 Ren Long 

 Tian Ye
 Wang Chunli
 Yin Qiao
 Zhang Chengye
 Zhang Qing

Cross country skiing

Entry list

 Wang Chunli
 Wang Songtao
 Xia Wan
 Zhang Chengye
 Zhang Qing 
 Bian Wenyou
 Han Dawei
 Hou Yuxia

 Huo Li
 Li Geliang
 Li Hongxue
 Liu Yuanyuan 
 Ma Dandan
 Song Bo
 Sun Qinghai

Figure skating

Entry list
 Zhao Hongbo
 Shen Xue
 Li Jiaqi
 Xu Jiankun
 Suo Bin 
 Liu Lu

Freestyle skiing

Entry list
 Li Ke
 Qiu Sen
 Guo Xinxin
 Li Nina
 Han Xiaopeng

References

Asian Winter Games
2007
Nations at the 2007 Asian Winter Games